The King's Guard is a ceremonial designation given by the Monarchy of Thailand to the various units within the Royal Thai Armed Forces. Practical and real security of the Royal family has since 1992 been provided by the Royal Security Command, which is an agency that is completely independent of the armed forces.

History

The first Royal Guards unit was established by King Chulalongkorn (Rama V) in 1859, when he was still the heir. Initially, the Royal Guards were servants with duties such as scaring crows, which led to commoners referring to them as the "Mahat Lek Lai Ka," roughly translated as "Scarecrow Corps".

When he succeeded his father in 1868, King Chulalongkorn took his Royal Guard and formed a 24-strong Royal Bodyguard, referred to as the "Thahan Song Lo" (Two-Dozen soldiers"). In 1870, the Royal Guard regiment were given the name the "King's Guard" and their duties included escorting the king while he travelled around the country.

About the year 1875 the necessity for surveys in connection with improvements in the city of Bangkok, and for supervision in carrying out these improvements, led to the selection of certain officers of the royal bodyguard for training in this direction. These officers were formed into a special company called "Military Engineers of the Royal Bodyguard," in which Mr. James McCarthy held the rank of captain. A royal decree issued September 3, 1885, separated the surveyors from the royal bodyguard and created the Royal Survey Department, which is now the Royal Thai Survey Department, a Special Services Group of the Royal Thai Armed Forces Headquarters.

The Royal Guards still exist down to the present and many more units from all branches of the armed forces were given this distinction. Today's King's Guard units serve as the Thai equivalent to the ceremonial guards units of various countries. However the role of the actual protection of the Royal family has been taken over by the Royal Security Command, established in 1992, with King Vajiralongkorn as its commander.

King's Guard units
The Royal Guards are today composed of 87 formations (formerly 94 battalions or equivalents), mostly found in the Royal Thai Army.

Royal Security Command 
The Royal Security Command is in charge of two Infantry regiments:

 1st Infantry Regiment, King's Close Bodyguard, 'The king's close bodyguards')
1st Infantry Battalion, 1st King's Own Bodyguard Regiment
2nd Infantry Battalion, 1st King's Own Bodyguard Regiment
3rd Infantry Battalion, 1st King's Own Bodyguard Regiment
 11th Infantry Regiment, King's Close Bodyguard,, 'The palace bodyguards')
 1st Infantry Battalion, 11th King's Own Bodyguard Regiment
 2nd Infantry Battalion, 11th King's Own Bodyguard Regiment
 3rd Infantry Battalion, 11th King's Own Bodyguard Regiment

Royal Thai Army
Cadet unit
Chulachomklao Royal Military Academy Cadet Regiment, King's Guard (Cadet students of the Royal Military Academy)
1st Cadet Battalion, Chulachomklao Royal Military Academy Cadet Regiment, King's Guard, Chulachomklao Royal Military Academy
2nd Cadet Battalion, Chulachomklao Royal Military Academy Cadet Regiment, King's Guard, Chulachomklao Royal Military Academy
3rd Cadet Battalion, Chulachomklao Royal Military Academy Cadet Regiment, King's Guard, Chulachomklao Royal Military Academy
4th Cadet Battalion, Chulachomklao Royal Military Academy Cadet Regiment, King's Guard, Chulachomklao Royal Military Academy

Infantry units
1st Division, King's Guard
31st Infantry Regiment, King Bhumibol's Guard (Airborne)
1st Infantry Battalion, 31st Infantry Regiment, King Bhumibol's Guard
2nd Infantry Battalion, 31st Infantry Regiment, King Bhumibol's Guard
3rd Infantry Battalion, 31st Infantry Regiment, King Bhumibol's Guard
2nd Infantry Division, Queen Sirikit's Guard (Designated in honour of Queen Sirikit in 1988)
2nd Infantry Regiment, Queen Sirikit's Guard
1st Infantry Battalion, 2nd Infantry Regiment, Queen Sirikit's Guard
2nd Infantry Battalion, 2nd Infantry Regiment, Queen Sirikit's Guard
3rd Infantry Battalion, 2nd Infantry Regiment, Queen Sirikit's Guard
12th Infantry Regiment, Queen Sirikit's Guard
1st Infantry Battalion, 12th Infantry Regiment, Queen Sirikit's Guard
2nd Infantry Battalion, 12th Infantry Regiment, Queen Sirikit's Guard
3rd Infantry Battalion, 12th Infantry Regiment, Queen Sirikit's Guard
21st Infantry Regiment, Queen Sirikit's Guard (a.k.a. "Thahan Suea Rachini")
1st Infantry Battalion, 21st Infantry Regiment, Queen Sirikit's Guard
2nd Infantry Battalion, 21st Infantry Regiment, Queen Sirikit's Guard
3rd Infantry Battalion, 21st Infantry Regiment, Queen Sirikit's Guard

Cavalry units
 2nd Cavalry Division, King Vajiravudh's Guard
 27th Cavalry Squadron, 2nd Cavalry Division, King Vajiravudh's Guard
 29th Cavalry Squadron, King Bhumibol's Guard
 1st Cavalry Regiment, King Vajiravudh's Guard
 1st Cavalry Squadron, 1st Cavalry Regiment, King Vajiravudh's Guard
 3rd Cavalry Squadron, 1st Cavalry Regiment, King Vajiravudh's Guard
 17th Cavalry Squadron, 1st Cavalry Regiment, King Vajiravudh's Guard
 4th Cavalry Regiment, Princess Srinagarindra's Guard
 5th Cavalry Squadron, 4th Cavalry Regiment, Princess Srinagarindra's Guard
 11th Cavalry Squadron, 4th Cavalry Regiment, King Vajiravudh's Guard
 25th Cavalry Squadron, 4th Cavalry Regiment, King Vajiravudh's Guard
 5th Cavalry Regiment, King Vajiravudh's Guard
20th Cavalry Squadron, 5th Cavalry Regiment, Princess Srinagarindra's Guard
23rd Cavalry Squadron, 5th Cavalry Regiment, King Vajiravudh's Guard
24th Cavalry Squadron, 5th Cavalry Regiment, King Vajiravudh's Guard
 4th Tank Battalion, 1st Division, King's Guard
 2nd Cavalry Squadron, 2nd Infantry Division, Queen Sirikit's Guard
 30th Cavalry Squadron, 2nd Infantry Division, Queen Sirikit's Guard

Artillery units
1st Field Artillery Regiment, King's Guard
1st Field Artillery Battalion, 1st Field Artillery Regiment, King's Guard
11th Field Artillery Battalion, 1st Field Artillery Regiment, King's Guard
31st Field Artillery Battalion, 1st Field Artillery Regiment, King's Guard
2nd Field Artillery Regiment, Queen Sirikit's Guard
2nd Field Artillery Battalion, 2nd Field Artillery Regiment, Queen Sirikit's Guard
12th Field Artillery Battalion, 2nd Field Artillery Regiment, Queen Sirikit's Guard
21st Field Artillery Battalion, 2nd Field Artillery Regiment, Queen Sirikit's Guard
102nd Field Artillery Battalion, 2nd Field Artillery Regiment, Queen Sirikit's Guard
1st Air Defense Artillery Battalion, King's Guard, 2nd Air Defense Artillery Regiment, King's Guard

Engineer units
1st Engineer Regiment, King's Guard
52nd Engineer Battalion, 1st Engineer Regiment, King's Guard
112nd Engineer Battalion, 1st Engineer Regiment, King's Guard
1st Engineer Battalion, 1st Division, King's Guard
2nd Engineer Battalion, 2nd Infantry Division, Queen Sirikit's Guard

Special Operations
3rd Special Forces Regiment, King's Guard
Ranger Battalion, King's Guard (Royal Thai Army Ranger)
Special Operation Battalion, King's Guard (Task Force 90)

Royal Thai Navy
Cadet unit
Naval Cadet Regiment, King's Guard (Cadet students of the Royal Naval Academy)
1st Cadet Battalion, Naval Cadet Regiment, King's Guard, Royal Thai Naval Academy
2nd Cadet Battalion, Naval Cadet Regiment, King's Guard, Royal Thai Naval Academy
3rd Cadet Battalion, Naval Cadet Regiment, King's Guard, Royal Thai Naval Academy
4th Cadet Battalion, Naval Cadet Regiment, King's Guard, Royal Thai Naval Academy

Royal Thai Marine Corps
1st Marine Battalion, King's Guard, 1st Infantry Regiment, Marine Division, Royal Thai Marine Corps
9th Marine Battalion, King's Guard, 3rd Infantry Regiment, Marine Division, Royal Thai Marine Corps

Royal Thai Air Force
Cadet unit
Air Cadet Regiment, King's Guard, Navaminda Kasatriyadhiraj Royal Thai Air Force Academy (Cadet students of the Royal Air Force Academy)
1st Cadet Battalion, Air Cadet Regiment, King's Guard, Navaminda Kasatriyadhiraj Royal Thai Air Force Academy
2nd Cadet Battalion, Air Cadet Regiment, King's Guard, Navaminda Kasatriyadhiraj Royal Thai Air Force Academy
3rd Cadet Battalion, Air Cadet Regiment, King's Guard, Navaminda Kasatriyadhiraj Royal Thai Air Force Academy
4th Cadet Battalion, Air Cadet Regiment, King's Guard, Navaminda Kasatriyadhiraj Royal Thai Air Force Academy
5th Cadet Battalion, Air Cadet Regiment, King's Guard, Navaminda Kasatriyadhiraj Royal Thai Air Force Academy

Royal Thai Air Force Security Force Regiment
Royal Thai Air Force Security Force Regiment, King's Guard
 1st Security Force Battalion, Royal Thai Air Force Security Force Regiment, King's Guard, Security Force Command
 2nd Security Force Battalion, Royal Thai Air Force Security Force Regiment, King's Guard, Security Force Command
 3rd Security Force Battalion, Royal Thai Air Force Security Force Regiment, King's Guard, Security Force Command

Anti-Aircraft Artillery
Anti-Aircraft Artillery Regiment, King's Guard
1st Anti-Aircraft Artillery Battalion, Anti-Aircraft Artillery Regiment, King's Guard
2nd Anti-Aircraft Artillery Battalion, Anti-Aircraft Artillery Regiment, King's Guard
3rd Anti-Aircraft Artillery Battalion, Anti-Aircraft Artillery Regiment, King's Guard

Former King's Guard units

Royal Thai Army 
Infantry units
4th Infantry Battalion, 1st Infantry Regiment, King Chulalongkorn’s Guard (amalgamated with the Royal Security Command as King's Own Bodyguard Command in 2017)

Signal units
1st Signal Battalion, King's Guard
12th Signal Battalion, King's Guard
2nd Signal Battalion, 2nd Infantry Division, Queen Sirikit's Guard

Medical units
1st Medical Battalion, 1st Division, King's Guard
2nd Medical Battalion, 2nd Infantry Division, Queen Sirikit's Guard

Ordnance units
Maintenance Battalion, Support Regiment, 2nd Cavalry Division, King Vajiravudh's Guard
Maintenance Battalion, Support Regiment, 2nd Infantry Division, Queen Sirikit's Guard

Transportation units
Transportation Regiment, King's Guard
1st Transportation Battalion, Transportation Regiment, King's Guard
2nd Transportation Battalion Combat Team, Transportation Regiment, King's Guard

Royal Thai Navy 
Royal Thai Marine Corps
Marine Command Garrison, 1st Infantry Regiment, King's Guard, Marine Division, Royal Thai Marine Corps
Marine Command Garrison, 3rd Infantry Regiment, King's Guard, Marine Division, Royal Thai Marine Corps

Royal Thai Air Force 
Squadrons
 201 Helicopter Squadrons, King's Guard
 602 Royal Flight Squadrons, King's Guard

Royal Military Endorsement units 
In addition, they established their own endorsement units. They are mostly retired, currently they have only three units left.

Royal Thai Army

Active 
6th Cavalry Squadron, 6th Cavalry Regiment, Queen Saovabha Phongsri's Endorsement Unit
 14th Cavalry Squadron, 7th Cavalry Regiment, Queen Saovabha Phongsri's Endorsement Unit
 3rd Infantry Battalion, 17th Infantry Regiment, Princess Srinagarindra's Endorsement Unit

Retired 
1st Infantry Battalion, 3rd Infantry Regiment, King's Endorsement Unit
6th Infantry Regiment, Crown Prince's Endorsement Unit 
1st Infantry Battalion, 6th Infantry Regiment, Crown Prince's Endorsement Unit
2nd Infantry Battalion, 6th Infantry Regiment, Crown Prince's Endorsement Unit
3rd Infantry Battalion, 6th Infantry Regiment, Crown Prince's Endorsement Unit
1st Infantry Battalion, 7th Infantry Regiment, King's Endorsement Unit
2nd Infantry Battalion, 5th Infantry Regiment, King's Endorsement Unit
3rd Infantry Battalion, 5th Infantry Regiment, Princess Royal's Endorsement Unit
152nd Infantry Regiment, Princess Royal's Endorsement Unit
1st Infantry Battalion, 152nd Infantry Regiment, Princess Royal's Endorsement Unit
2nd Infantry Battalion, 152nd Infantry Regiment, Princess Royal's Endorsement Unit
3rd Infantry Battalion, 152nd Infantry Regiment, Princess Royal's Endorsement Unit
1st Infantry Battalion, Infantry Center, King's Endorsement Unit

Gallery

See also

Thai Royal Guards parade
Monarchy of Thailand
Royal Security Command
Head of the Royal Thai Armed Forces
List of army units called Guards

References

Further reading
Kenneth Conboy, South-East Asian Special Forces (Osprey)

 
Military units and formations established in 1859
Guards regiments
Thailand Royal Guards
1859 establishments in Siam
Thai monarchy
Guards of honour

wuu:王家泰国军队